Polycentrus is a genus of small fish belonging to the family Polycentridae. They are found in fresh and brackish water in northern South America and Trinidad.

Species
There are currently 2 recognized species in this genus:

 Polycentrus jundia Coutinho & Wosiacki, 2014
 Polycentrus schomburgkii Müller & Troschel, 1849 (Guyana leaffish)

References

Polycentridae